The following is a list of episodes made from the CBS television series, CSI: Miami.

The first three seasons of CSI: Miami consisted of 24 episodes each, while season four has 25 episodes. The fifth season once again consisted of 24 episodes, while the sixth season only has 21 episodes. The seventh season, like the fourth, has 25 episodes, while the eighth has 24 episodes. The ninth season consisted of 22 episodes, and the tenth and final season has 19 episodes. A total of 232 original episodes of CSI: Miami were broadcast during the show's ten-season run.

Series overview

Episodes

Backdoor pilot (2002)

For the backdoor pilot, "No. overall" and "No. in season" refer to the episode's place in the order of episodes of the parent series CSI: Crime Scene Investigation.

Season 1 (2002–03)

David Caruso, Emily Procter, Adam Rodriguez, Khandi Alexander, Rory Cochrane, and Kim Delaney star. Kim Delaney departs the cast following the tenth episode. Rex Linn and Sofia Milos both begin continuous recurring arcs this season.

Season 2 (2003–04)

David Caruso, Emily Procter, Adam Rodriguez, Khandi Alexander, and Rory Cochrane star. Rex Linn and Sofia Milos both continue their recurring arcs. "MIA/NYC Nonstop" serves as the pilot episode of CSI: NY, and stars Gary Sinise and Melina Kanakaredes.

Season 3 (2004–05)

David Caruso, Emily Procter, Adam Rodriguez, Khandi Alexander, and Rory Cochrane star. Cochrane departs the main cast after the first episode. Jonathan Togo and Sofia Milos join the main cast, while Milos departs again at the end of the season. Rex Linn continues to recur.

Season 4 (2005–06)

David Caruso, Emily Procter, Adam Rodriguez, Khandi Alexander, and Jonathan Togo star. Rex Linn continues to recur, Eva LaRue begins a continuous arc.

Season 5 (2006–07)

David Caruso, Emily Procter, Adam Rodriguez, Khandi Alexander, and Jonathan Togo star. Rex Linn and Eva LaRue join the main cast. Sofia Milos guest stars.

Season 6 (2007–08)

David Caruso, Emily Procter, Adam Rodriguez, Khandi Alexander, Jonathan Togo, Rex Linn, and Eva LaRue star. Khandi Alexander departs the main cast at the end of the season. Rory Cochrane and Sofia Milos guest star.

Season 7 (2008–09)

David Caruso, Emily Procter, Adam Rodriguez, Jonathan Togo, Rex Linn, and Eva LaRue star. Megalyn Echikunwoke joins the main cast, and departs again at the end of the season. Khandi Alexander and Sofia Milos guest star.

Season 8 (2009–10)

David Caruso, Emily Procter, Adam Rodriguez, Jonathan Togo, Rex Linn, and Eva LaRue star. Eddie Cibrian and Omar Miller join the main cast, with Cibrian departing at the end of the season. Rodriguez leaves the main cast in episode five, recurring thereafter. Khandi Alexander guest stars.

Season 9 (2010–11)

David Caruso, Emily Procter, Jonathan Togo, Rex Linn, Eva LaRue, and Omar Miller star. Eddie Cibrian guest stars, while Adam Rodriguez rejoins the main cast.

Season 10 (2011–12)

David Caruso, Emily Procter, Jonathan Togo, Rex Linn, Eva LaRue, Omar Miller, and Adam Rodriguez star.

Ratings

Home video releases 
Region 4 (Australia) releases all contain 6 discs with the exception of season five which contains 5 discs.

References
 

List of CSI: Miami episodes
Lists of American crime drama television series episodes
Miami-related lists